The mountain spiny pocket mouse (Heteromys oresterus) is a species of rodent in the family Heteromyidae. It is endemic to Costa Rica. Its natural habitat is subtropical or tropical moist lowland forests.

References

Heteromys
Rodents of Central America
Endemic fauna of Costa Rica
Mammals described in 1932
Taxonomy articles created by Polbot